"Waldorf Salad" is the third episode of the second series of the BBC sitcom Fawlty Towers. Directed by Bob Spiers, it first aired on 5 March 1979.

Plot
Dinner is exceptionally busy at the hotel, and the guests complain to Sybil about the quality of the service. However, when Basil checks with the guests, they do not mention their complaints. As service winds down, a new couple arrives, Mr. and Mrs. Hamilton; while Mrs. Hamilton is British, her husband is American, and runs a list of complaints about their travels from London compared with the United States. Because of their late arrival, Mr. Hamilton asks Basil to bribe the cook to keep the kitchen open so they can have a meal after they have unpacked. Basil tries to trick Terry the chef with only half of what Mr. Hamilton gave him. Terry agrees, but claims it will cause him to miss a karate class, but then Polly reveals that she, Terry, Manuel, and Terry's Finnish girlfriend were to have a night out. Irritated by Terry's fib, Basil sends them on their way, intending to cook for the Hamiltons himself.

The Hamiltons first ask for screwdrivers, of which Basil has never heard, irritating Mr. Hamilton. They ask for a Waldorf salad, an item not on the menu, followed by two rare steaks. Basil similarly has no idea what goes into a Waldorf salad, and his attempts to make it are criticised by Mr. Hamilton. Basil returns to the kitchen and shouts loudly as if he were yelling at the cook. Basil makes other excuses, unaware that Sybil has been able to prepare and serve the proper dish. Basil, on discovering this, faux-yells at the chef, but Sybil follows him into the kitchen and slaps Basil for his antics. Later, Basil reads a letter supposedly from Terry that puts all the blame on the chef, but during this, the unattended steaks start to burn, and draw the guests to the lobby.

Mr. Hamilton yells at Basil, stating the hotel is "the crummiest, shoddiest, most badly run hotel in Western Europe", and Basil is comparable to Donald Duck. Basil coerces the resident guests to acknowledge the quality of his hotel, but as he continues to argue with Mr. Hamilton, the other guests start venting their own problems. Mr. Hamilton laughs at Basil as he goes off to pack his bags. Basil snaps at the other guests, comparing them to Nazi Germany, and insisting to Sybil that either the guests go, or he does. Sybil stares at him, and Basil quickly exits the hotel, only to return seconds later after he realise it's raining, requesting a room and breakfast in bed, complete with a Waldorf Salad and "lashings of hot screwdriver."

Cast
 John Cleese as Basil Fawlty
 Prunella Scales as Sybil Fawlty
 Andrew Sachs as Manuel
 Connie Booth as Polly Sherman
 Ballard Berkeley as Major Gowen
 Brian Hall as Terry the Chef
 Gilly Flower as Miss Abitha Tibbs
 Renee Roberts as Miss Ursula Gatsby

With:
 Norman Bird as Mr. Arrad
 Bruce Boa as Mr. (Harry) Hamilton
 Terence Conoley as Mr. Johnston
 Anthony Dawes as Mr. Libson
 June Ellis as Mrs. Johnston
 Dorothy Frere as Miss (Doris) Hare
 Claire Nielson as Mrs. Hamilton
 Beatrice Shaw as Miss Gurke
 Stella Tanner as Mrs. Arrad

Reception
The episode has been described as being "massively popular" and a great success commercially internationally in the 1980s and 1990s. Its source of amusement derives from the cultural differences between the Americans and the British and the perceived differences in manners. The American is very rude in expecting food which is not on the menu and complaining about the service in contrast to the English guests who are very guarded when it comes to complaining. The book Great, Grand & Famous Hotels remarked that "Fawlty Towers is real to everybody who has ever worked in a hotel, anybody who has ever stayed in one, or anyone who has ever tried, unsuccessfully, to order a Waldorf salad."

References

Bibliography
 Fawlty Towers: A Worshipper's Companion, Leo Publishing, 
 The Complete Fawlty Towers by John Cleese & Connie Booth (1988, Methuen, London)  (the complete text)

External links

Waldorf
1979 British television episodes